Borzyszkowo  is a village in the administrative district of Gmina Więcbork, within Sępólno County, Kuyavian-Pomeranian Voivodeship, in north-central Poland.

The village has an approximate population of 170.

References

Borzyszkowo